Perth—Wellington—Waterloo was a federal electoral district represented in the House of Commons of Canada from 1988 to 1997. It was located in the province of Ontario. This riding was created in 1987 from parts of Perth, Waterloo and Wellington—Dufferin—Simcoe ridings.

The riding consisted of the County of Perth,  the townships of Wellesley and Wilmot in the Regional Municipality of Waterloo, and the Village of Drayton and the townships of Maryborough and Peel in the County of Wellington.

It was abolished in 1996 when it was re-distributed between Perth—Middlesex and Waterloo—Wellington ridings.

Members of Parliament

Electoral history

See also 

 List of Canadian federal electoral districts
 Past Canadian electoral districts

External links 

 Website of the Parliament of Canada

Former federal electoral districts of Ontario